This article lists notable electoral firsts in Italy.

General 

 First general election with universal suffrage: 1913 (only males), 1946 (both sex);
 First organized political party in the Italian Parliament: Partito Socialista Italiano, 1895;

Women

First female Prime Minister of Italy 

 Giorgia Meloni in 2022

First female President of the Italian Chamber of Deputies 

 Nilde Iotti in 1979

First female President of the Italian Senate 
 Elisabetta Casellati in 2018

First female Minister of Foreign Affairs 

 Emma Bonino in 2013

First female Minister of the Interior 

 Rosa Russo Iervolino in 1998

First female Minister of Justice 

 Paola Severino in 2011

First female Minister of Defence 

 Roberta Pinotti in 2014

First female Minister of Economic Development 

 Federica Guidi in 2014

First female Minister of Agriculture 

 Adriana Poli Bortone in 1994

First female Minister of the Environment 

 Stefania Prestigiacomo in 2008

First female Minister of Infrastructure and Transport 

 Paola De Micheli in 2019

First female Minister of Labour and Social Policies 

 Tina Anselmi in 1976 (also first female Minister in general)

First female Minister of Public Education 

 Franca Falcucci in 1982

First female Minister of Culture 

 Vincenza Bono in 1988

First female Minister of Health 

 Tina Anselmi in 1978

First female constable ("ufficiale giudiziario") 

 Maria Luisa Strina, 1964

Black Italians 

 Jean-Léonard Touadi, first black deputy in 2008

 Toni Iwobi, first black senator in 2018
 Cécile Kyenge, first black Minister in 2013

LGBT people 

 Vladimir Luxuria, first transgender deputy in 2006

References 

Elections in Italy
Lists of firsts
Italy politics-related lists